The 2016–17 Rhode Island Rams basketball team represented the University of Rhode Island during the 2016–17 NCAA Division I men's basketball season. The Rams, led by fifth-year head coach Dan Hurley, played their home games at the Ryan Center in Kingston, Rhode Island as members of the Atlantic 10 Conference. They finished the season 25–10, 13–5 in A-10 play to finish in a tie for third place. In the A-10 tournament, they defeated St. Bonaventure, Davidson, and VCU to win the A-10 Tournament championship. As a result, they received the conference's automatic bid to the NCAA tournament. They received a No. 11 seed in the Midwest region where they defeated No. 6-seeded Creighton in the first round before losing to No. 3-seeded Oregon in the second round.

Previous season
The Rams finished the 2015–16 season 17–15, 9–9 in A-10 play to finish in seventh place. They lost in the second round of the A-10 tournament to Massachusetts.

Departures

Incoming recruits

Class of 2017 recruits

Preseason 
The Rams were picked to finish second in the Preseason A-10 poll. E.C. Matthews and Hassan Martin were named to the All-Conference Preseason Second Team. Martin was named to the All-Defensive Preseason Team as well.

Roster

Schedule and results

|-
!colspan=9 style=| Non-conference regular season

|-
!colspan=12 style=| Atlantic 10 regular season

|-
!colspan=9 style=| Atlantic 10 tournament

|-
!colspan=9 style=| NCAA tournament

|-

Rankings

*AP does not release post-NCAA Tournament rankings

See also
 2016–17 Rhode Island Rams women's basketball team

References

Rhode Island Rams men's basketball seasons
Rhode Island
Rhode Island